West station can refer to:

Australia 
 Cootamundra West railway station

Austria 
 Innsbruck Westbahnhof
 Villach Westbahnhof
 Wien Westbahnhof railway station

Belgium 
 Brussels-West station
 Charleroi-West railway station

Canada 
 Montréal-Ouest station

Denmark 
 Varde Vest Station, Varde

France 
 Gare Montparnasse, once station of the Chemins de fer de l'Ouest

Germany 
 Aachen West station
 Eisenach West station
 Frankfurt West station
 Gevelsberg West station
 Tübingen West station

Hungary 
 Budapest Nyugati station

Netherlands 
 Veenendaal West railway station

North Korea 
 Sopyongyang station (West P'yŏngyang station)

People's Republic of China 
 Beijing West railway station

Sweden 
 Malmö West Station (Malmö Västra)
 Östersund Västra Train Station, Östersund
 Sundsvalls västra station, Stenstan

Switzerland 
 Aareschlucht West railway station
 Brienz West railway station
 Chur West railway station
 Interlaken West railway station
 Solothurn West railway station (Westbahnhof)

United Kingdom
West Acton tube station
Allens West railway station
Bangor West railway station
Canterbury West railway station
West Croydon railway station
Dorchester West railway station
Dorking West railway station
West Ealing railway station
Folkestone West railway station
Greenock West railway station
Hamilton West railway station
West Harrow tube station
Hillington West railway station
Hounslow West tube station
Kentish Town West railway station
Maidstone West railway station
Oakwood tube station, formerly known as Enfield West
Penge West railway station
Pollokshaws West railway station
Pollokshields West railway station
Reading West railway station
Tunbridge Wells West railway station
Watford West railway station
West Sutton railway station
West Worthing railway station

United States
West Acton station (MBTA)
West Baltimore station
West Barnstable station
Boston University West station
Chestnut Hill West station
Corona–West station
West Concord station
West Glacier station
West Gloucester station
West Haven station
West Hingham station
West Medford station
Mount Vernon West station
West Natick station
West Newton station
West Palm Beach station
West Roxbury station
West Station (MBTA)
West Trenton station

See also 

 East Station (disambiguation)
 North Station (disambiguation)
 South Station (disambiguation)